The 1975 U.S. Open was the 75th U.S. Open, held June 19–23, at Medinah Country Club in Medinah, Illinois, a suburb northwest of Chicago. Lou Graham defeated John Mahaffey by two strokes in an 18-hole Monday playoff to win his only major championship.

Tom Watson shot 135 (−7) to tie the U.S. Open record for the first 36 holes of play, but 155 (+13) on the weekend forced him down the leaderboard, three shots out of the Graham-Mahaffey playoff. It marked the second straight year Watson failed to maintain a weekend lead in the championship; he was the 54-hole leader in 1974 at Winged Foot. He won the next major a month later in Scotland at Carnoustie.

Arnold Palmer finished in a tie for ninth place, his final top-10 finish at the U.S. Open. Jerry Pate tied for 18th place and shared low amateur honors with Jay Haas; Pate won the following year as a tour rookie.

Paired with Palmer was Masters champion Jack Nicklaus, who was two-under in the final round and just missed a birdie putt on the 15th green. He carded three consecutive bogeys to finish and ended up two strokes back. Nicklaus rebounded and won the PGA Championship in August at Firestone.

The quality of the play was generally regarded as poor. Despite the high scores Jack Nicklaus said it was the "easiest" U.S. Open he had ever remembered playing. Runner-up John Mahaffey stated at the end of the event, "This course was never as difficult as the scores looked. I agree with everybody who said it was the easiest Open in history to have won. At least 10 guys could have won it by five shots if they'd played golf." The sportswriter Dan Jenkins regularly panned the performance of the players in his Sport Illustrated cover profile, stating in his opening sentence that "it was a golf tournament that begged to be forgotten."

Since moving to the four-day format in 1965, this is the only U.S. Open in which the final round was not scheduled for Father's Day, the third Sunday in June.

This was the second U.S. Open at Medinah, the first was held in 1949. It later hosted in 1990, also a playoff, and the PGA Championship in 1999 and 2006, both won by Tiger Woods. Medinah was the venue for the Ryder Cup in 2012.

This was the final year that players were not allowed to have their own caddies at the U.S. Open. The other majors and some PGA Tour events had traditionally disallowed players from using their own caddies. The Masters required club caddies from Augusta National through

Course layout

Past champions in the field

Made the cut

Source:

Missed the cut

Source:

Round summaries

First round
Thursday, June 19, 1975

Source:

Second round
Friday, June 20, 1975

Source:

Third round
Saturday, June 21, 1975

Source:

Final round
Sunday, June 22, 1975

Frank Beard began the final round with a three-stroke lead, four over Graham and six ahead of Mahaffey.  But after bogeys at 16 and 17, he staggered home with a 78 (+7) to finish a shot behind. Mahaffey holed a  putt for birdie at 14, then parred out the rest of the way to post an even-par 71 and 287 total. Graham went to the 18th with a one-stroke lead and a chance to win in regulation, but he hit his approach into a bunker and failed to save par and fell into a tie with Mahaffey. Several other players had an opportunity to join the playoff. Bob Murphy was tied until a bogey at 18 dropped him a shot out of the playoff, and Ben Crenshaw found the water on 17 and also finished a stroke out, as did defending champion Hale Irwin. Second round leader Tom Watson had another difficult day and fell into a tie for ninth. Jack Nicklaus bogeyed the last three holes and finished two strokes out of the playoff.

Source:

Scorecard

Cumulative tournament scores, relative to par

Source:

Playoff
Monday, June 23, 1975

Graham jumped out to an early advantage in the playoff, recording birdies at 4, 5, and 10 en route to a 71 and a two-stroke win over Mahaffey.

Scorecard

Source:

References

External links
USGA Championship Database
USOpen.com - 1975

U.S. Open (golf)
Golf in Illinois
Medinah, Illinois
U.S. Open
U.S. Open (golf)
U.S. Open
U.S. Open (golf)